Cody Willard (born August 31, 1972, in Ruidoso, New Mexico), is an American investor, television anchor and current hedge fund manager.

He is the publisher of a subscription-based investment newsletter TradingWithCody.com and the author of the #1 Amazon best-seller, "Everything You Need to Know About Investing" as well as several other books.

He was an anchor on the Fox Business Network, where he was the co-host of the long-time #1-rated show on the network, Fox Business Happy Hour, was the Wall Street Correspondent for The Tonight Show with Jay Leno and was Larry's Kudlow's sidekick on CNBC's Kudlow & Company. He has had a featured investment column for The Financial Times, Marketwatch, the WSJ, TheStreet.com. Willard also served as an adjunct professor at Seton Hall University where he taught class called "Revolutionomics" focused on technology, business and politics.

He began his career at Oppenheimer & Co. in 1996 (after his first job in New York City, a barista at Starbucks) and was chief analyst at Visual Radio, a technology venture capital fund, and vice president of wholesale operations at Broadview Networks, a telecommunications company.

Personal life
Willard grew up in Ruidoso, New Mexico with actor Neil Patrick Harris, who later invested in his friend's hedge fund and the two remain close friends and business partners. Willard earned a bachelor's degree in economics at the University of New Mexico, where he played basketball as a walk-on.

He is a musician who has played backup guitar for Neil Sedaka, Lorrie Morgan and others, and is a songwriter and producer with the indie rock band The Muddy Souls.

References

External links
FoxBusiness.com bio
The Revolutionewsletter, a paid investment advice column that Cody runs
Spokeup.com, a closed social network
Appconsumer.com, Cody's Newest venture focusing on the best apps for the modern consumer and current technology events

American bloggers
American male journalists
American finance and investment writers
University of New Mexico alumni
Fox Business people
1972 births
Living people
People from Ruidoso, New Mexico
Seton Hall University faculty
21st-century American non-fiction writers
American male bloggers